Su Yu-chang (– ), was a Taiwanese martial artist, scholar and practitioner of traditional Chinese medicine who devoted his life to teaching kung fu, traditional Chinese philosophy and medicine all over the world.

Life and career
Su’s father,  (蘇正生), was one of the members of the legendary Taiwanese Kano baseball team. Su started his studies of Kung Fu at the age of eight under Praying Mantis Master Chang Tekuei, who came to work as a foreigner from mainland China and taught him Mizong Quan and Pimen Tanglang Quan. After studying with other famous masters, he became since 1963 a notable disciple of Liu Yunqiao, founder of the Wutan Center for the Promotion of Chinese Wushu (武壇國術推廣中心), an institution to which he gave international continuity in the form of the Pachi Tanglang Martial Arts Institute (八極螳螂武藝總舘), with branches worldwide.

In 1976, Su travelled to Venezuela, where he settled in Caracas. He started a practice of Chinese traditional medicine and started teaching several styles of kung fu. Initially he taught jointly with fellow expatriate Dai Shizhe (戴士哲) at La danza del dragón school, and some time after he founded the Instituto Pachimen (八極門). During this period, he served as vice-president of the South American Martial Arts Federation. In 1989 he travelled to Mallorca, where he founded the first European branch of his institute, now rebranded Pachi Tanglang Martial Arts Institute. Shortly thereafter a Barcelona branch opened, and in 1992 Master Su was hired to train special security teams for the Olympic Games in Barcelona. In the following years, new branches of the school were opened in Tokyo, New York, the Netherlands, Norway and the UK. Master Su would spend the year doing the rounds of the Institute around the world, securing the transmission for posterity of the wealth of knowledge he had accumulated.

In later years, Su returned to his native Taiwan, where he strengthened the Taipei and Kaohsiung branches of the school, and from where he would continue to travel extensively. He died in La Palma, Canary Islands, in April 2019.

Works
Master Su published a number of well received books on martial arts, mostly compiled from his lessons in Spanish, Japanese and English, as well as several video recordings on teachings of Bagua Quan, Baji Quan and several Praying Mantis substyles.

Bibliography
 Pachi Tanglang Chuan: Eight Ultimate Praying Mantis, Pachi Tanglang International, 2014.  
 I Ching: el oráculo, Madrid, Visión Libros, 2012. 
 Taichi Chuan to Awaken the Power of the Qi (気の力を覚醒させる太極拳), Tokyo, Budo-RA Books, 2009.  
 Secret Method of Praying Mantis Style (螳螂拳秘法), Tokyo, Budo-RA Books, 2007.   
 Pachi Tanglang Chuan, Madrid, Visión Libros, 2006. 
 Yang Taichi Chuan, Madrid, Visión Net, 2005.  
 The Invisible Web: A Taichi Chuan Manual, Palma de Mallorca, Asociación Europea Pachi Tanglang Chuan y Tao, 1998.  
 El tejido invisible: Manual de Taichi Chuan, Palma de Mallorca, Prensa Universitaria, 1995. 
 Pachi Tang Lang Chuen, Barcelona, Alas, 1990.

References

External links
 Memorial page at Wutan Alaska.
 Main English-language page of Pachi Tanglang International.
 Main Spanish site of Pachi Tanglang International.

1940 births
2019 deaths
20th-century Taiwanese physicians
Chinese martial artists
Chinese tai chi practitioners
Chinese xingyiquan practitioners
Martial arts school founders
Martial arts writers
People from Tainan
Taiwanese expatriates in Spain
Taiwanese expatriates in Venezuela
Taiwanese male martial artists
Taiwanese philosophers
Traditional Chinese medicine practitioners
20th-century philanthropists
Chinese baguazhang practitioners